Bloomfield is a village in Walworth County, Wisconsin, United States. The village was created on December 20, 2011, from unincorporated areas of the Town of Bloomfield. It includes all of the Pell Lake census-designated place and part of the Powers Lake census-designated place.

Demographics

Notes

External links
 Official Site

Villages in Walworth County, Wisconsin
Villages in Wisconsin